Väino Linde (born 31 January 1959 in Tallinn) is an Estonian lawyer and politician. From 1995 until 1996, he was Mayor of Pärnu. He has been member of the IX and X, XI and XII Riigikogu.

He is a member of Estonian Reform Party.

References

1959 births
Living people
Estonian Reform Party politicians
Members of the Riigikogu, 1999–2003
Members of the Riigikogu, 2003–2007
Members of the Riigikogu, 2007–2011
Members of the Riigikogu, 2011–2015
20th-century Estonian lawyers
Mayors of Pärnu
University of Tartu alumni
Politicians from Tallinn